PIP2, or phosphatidylinositol biphosphate, is the products obtained by cleavage of PIP3, or by phosphorylation of PI(3)P, PI(4)P or PI(5)P.

'PIP2' most frequently refers to:

 Phosphatidylinositol 4,5-bisphosphate, also known as PI(4,5)P2

The other PIP2 lipids are:

 Phosphatidylinositol 3,4-bisphosphate, also known as PI(3,4)P2
 Phosphatidylinositol 3,5-bisphosphate, also known as PI(3,5)P2

Phospholipids